This list of the tallest buildings and structures in Perth ranks buildings in the Scottish city of Perth by height. There are few high-rise buildings in Perth. The tallest buildings in the city are churches and city centre tower blocks.

Tallest buildings in Perth 
This list ranks externally complete Perth buildings and free-standing structures that stand more than 25 metres (82 ft) tall, based on standard height measurement. This includes spires and architectural details but does not include antenna masts. An equals sign (=) following a rank indicates the same height between two or more buildings. The "Year" column indicates the year in which a building was completed. Buildings that have been demolished (including the towering chimney of Pullar's Dyeworks) are not included. Some prominent Perth buildings such as St Ninian's Cathedral are just below this threshold.

Tallest structures in Perth

Gallery

See also 

 List of tallest buildings and structures in Edinburgh
 List of tallest buildings and structures in Glasgow

References 

 
Tallest buildings in Perth